The Narodnaya Letopis was the first newspaper of Novonikolayevsk, the Russian Empire. It was published in 1906–1907 and 1909–1910. The founder and first editor of the newspaper was Nikolay Litvinov.

History
At first the newspaper was published on March 30, 1906. Its appearance was associated with the elections to the 1st State Duma.

In 1909–1910, the newspaper faced pressure from the authorities because of its liberal course.

The Narodnaya Letopis ceased publication in 1910.

The Obskaya Zhizn newspaper is considered the successor to the Narodnaya Letopis.

Newspaper editors
 N. P. Litvinov (1906)
 M. O. Kursky (since No. 21, 1906)
 A. G. Novitsky (1909–1910)

Charity
Newspaper editoring of the "Narodnaya Letopis" organized a collection of donations for victims of the Novonikolayevsk Fire of 1909.

References

Bibliography

External links
 Первая газета нашего города — «Народная летопись». НДН.ИНФО.

Newspapers established in 1906
1906 establishments in the Russian Empire
Newspapers published in Novosibirsk